This is a list of notable Hausa people.

Emirs and Sultans

 Daurama
 Faruk Umar Faruk
 Queen Amina
 Awwal Ibrahim
 Muhammad Rumfa
 Yaji I
 Yunfa
 Queen Sarraounia

Footballers

 Abubakari Yakubu
 Abdoul Aziz Ibrahim
 Abdulrahman Bashir
 Ahmed Musa
 Ahmed Wadah
 Amadou Moutari
 Fatawu Mohammed
 Habib Mohamed
 Haruna Babangida
 Ibrahim Rabiu
 Issah Abdul Basit
 Illiasu Shilla
 Jamal Haruna
 Lalas Abubakar
 Masahudu Alhassan 
 Mohammed Abu
 Mohammed-Awal Issah
 Mohammed Rabiu
 Mohammed Razak
 Mohammed Lamine
 Mohamed Tijani
 Moussa Maâzou
 Mujaid Sadick
 Sani Kaita
 Shehu Abdullahi
 Tijani Babangida
 Umar Sadiq
 Mubarak Wakaso
 Rabiu Ali
 Yunus Musah
 Jamal Idris
 Mohammed Aminu
 Mohammed Haruna
 Lukman Haruna
 Seidu Abubakari
 Yussif Mubarik
 Yussif Moussa
 Zaidu Sanusi
 Idriss Harouna
 Issah Gabriel Ahmed
 Mohammed Salisu

Islamic clerics

 Sheikh Ibrahim Khaleel
 Ibrahim Zakzaky
 Ja'afar Mahmud Adam
 Kabiru Gombe
 Muhammad Auwal Albani Zaria
 Sani Yahaya Jingir

Musicians

Traditional

 Alhaji Mamman Shata 
 Dan Maraya Jos
 Barmani Coge
 Ali Jita

Modern

 Nazifi Asnanic
 Naziru M Ahmad
 Nura M Inuwa
 Sadiq Zazzabi
 Ali Jita
 TY Shaban
 Namenj
 Ado Gwanja

Politicians

 General Muhammadu Buhari
 Umaru Musa Yaradua
 Barrister Ibrahim Shehu Shema
 Aminu Bello Masari
 Nasir Ahmad El-Rufai   
 Senator Garba Yakubu Lado Danmarke
 Senator Kabiru Gaya
 Maitama Sule
 Kabir Tukur Ibrahim
 Mustapha Baba Shehuri
 Amb. Ahmed Bolori

Jurist
 Sidi Bage
 Tanko Muhammad

Journalist

 Jamilah Tangaza

Businesspeople

 Aliko Dangote
 Alhassan Dantata
 Alhaji Aminu Dantata
 Alhaji Isyaku Rabiu
 Alhaji Abdulsamad Rabiu
 Bashir Dalhatu

Academic

 Attahiru Jega
 Abba Gumel
 Abubakar Adamu Rasheed
 Muhammad Yahuza Bello
 Abdalla Uba Adamu
 Rabia Salihu Sa'id
 Tanko Muhammad
 Abdullahi Mustapha
 Ibrahim Garba
 Sheikh Ibrahim Khaleel

Military

 Mansur Dan Ali
 Mamman Kontagora
 Tukur Yusuf Buratai

Police

 Hafiz Ringim
 Suleiman Abba

Writers
 Zaynab Alkali
 Hauwa Ali
 Abubakar Imam

Actors

 Ali Nuhu
 Adam A Zango
 Rahama Sadau
 Mansur Makeup
 Momee Gombe

 
Lists of people by ethnicity